Classical Love is a short story by Chinese writer Yu Hua that is an unconventional parody of the classic scholar and beautiful maiden novel style.

References
 Hua, Yu. Translated by Andrew F. Jones. The Past and the Punishments. Honolulu, USA: University of Hawai'i Press, 1996. pp. 12–61. 

Short stories by Yu Hua